George Langelaan (19 January 1908 – 9 February 1972) was a French-British writer and journalist born in Paris, France.

He is best known for his 1957 short story "The Fly", which was the basis for the 1958 and 1986 sci-fi/horror films and a 2008 opera of the same name.

Career
During World War II, Langelaan worked as a spy and special agent for the Allied powers as part of the Special Operations Executive (SOE). He was in F Section SOE with the rank of lieutenant. His code name was "Langdon". According to his memoirs, The Masks of War (1959), he underwent plastic surgery to alter his appearance before being dropped into France. (The operation was deemed necessary so as to remove features that were too distinctive. He later explained that his ears were too large and that they had to be pinned back before he could be dropped into enemy territory.) He parachuted into occupied France on 7 September 1941 to make contact with the French resistance forces south of Châteauroux, arranged to meet Édouard Herriot, was captured on 6 October, imprisoned in the Mauzac camp, condemned to death by the Nazis, and escaped (16 July 1942) and returned to England to participate in the Normandy landings. He received the French Croix de guerre.

Langelaan was a friend of the occultist Aleister Crowley, claiming he was a spy and "that by winning the confidence of the Germans in America, he had access to members of their inner circle."

In the 1950s and 1960s he wrote his memoirs, novels, and short stories that were made into motion pictures and which were featured on television.

He died on February 9, 1972, less than a month after his 64th birthday.

Short stories

"The Fly"

Of all his literary works, he is best remembered for his 1957 short story "The Fly", which originally appeared in the June 1957 issue of Playboy magazine. The story itself has been adapted to the screen twice:
 the 1958 film with a screenplay by James Clavell, starring Vincent Price and David Hedison, and directed by Kurt Neumann; 
 the 1986 movie with screnplay by Charles Edward Pogue and David Cronenberg, starring Jeff Goldblum and Geena Davis, and directed by David Cronenberg. 

The 1958 film spawned two sequels; the 1986 film had one. 

It was also adapted into an opera by Academy Award-winning composer Howard Shore, which was premiered in 2008 and played Paris' Théâtre du Châtelet, and was directed by David Cronenberg with a libretto by Tony Award-winning playwright David Henry Hwang.

Bibliography

His books and short fiction include:

 One Named Langdon: Memories of a Secret Agent or Un nommé Langdon (1950)
 "The Fly" (in Playboy, June 1957; reprinted in the Second Pan Book of Horror Stories, edited by Herbert Van Thal, 1960)
 "Strange Miracle" (in Argosy, August 1958)
 The Masks of War: From Dunkirk to D-Day—The Masquerades of a British Intelligence Agent (1959) American edition published by Doubleday
 The Knights of the Floating Silk (1959)
 "Elaine" (in Argosy, January 1959)
 "Danse Macabre" (in Argosy, April 1959)
 "Albatross" (in Argosy, December 1959)
 "The Secret Notebooks of Agent P.P. 751" (1960–1963) series in the publication Controls
 "I Rescued a Harem Wife" (in Suspense, August 1960)
 "Cold Blood" (in New Worlds, October 1961)
 "The Other Hand" (in The Magazine of Fantasy & Science Fiction, October 1961)
 "Zombie Express Train" (1964)
 "The Dolphin Speaks Too" (1964)
 Out of Time (collection, 1964)
 "Attack-Rifle-2nd"
 "Torpedo the Torpedo"
 "Salad of Heads" (1965)
 The Flight of Anti-G or Le Vol de l'anti-G (1968)
 "The Thinking Robots" or "The Collector of Brains", "Les Robots pensants" in French
 Turncoat (1967)
 The New Parasites or Les Nouveaux parasites in French, with Jean Barral (1969)
 Thirteen Phantoms or Treize fantomes (1971)

Screen adaptations
The following movies and television episodes were based on his short stories:

 The Fly (1958) (story)
 The Return of the Fly (1959) (short story "The Fly")
 Alfred Hitchcock Presents episode "Strange Miracle" (1962) (story)
 Curse of the Fly (1965) (concept and characters) (uncredited)
 Night Gallery episode "The Hand of Borgus Weems" (1971) based on his short story "The Other Hand"
 Hyperion (1975) (story)
 Le Collectionneur des cerveaux (1976) (writer) also known as Les Robots pensants (The Thinking Robots) in French
 The Fly remake, or La Mouche in French (1986) (short story)
 The Fly II (1989) (characters)

Honors

His 1957 short story classic "The Fly" received Playboy magazine's Best Fiction Award and was selected for inclusion in the Annual of the Year's Best Science Fiction.

References

External links
 
 George Langelaan at the FictionMags Index
 George Langelaan  at the Index to Science Fiction Anthologies and Collections, Combined Edition

 
 
 The cover of the June, 1957 issue of Playboy, which contained the classic short story "The Fly"
 George Langelaan @ The Encyclopedia of Science Fiction, 3rd (online) edition.

1908 births
Langelann, George
British short story writers
World War II spies for the United Kingdom
Writers from Paris
The Fly (franchise)
French Special Operations Executive personnel
French anti-fascists
French emigrants to the United Kingdom